The 2020 Houston Dynamo season was the club's 15th season of existence since joining Major League Soccer prior to the 2006 season. The Dynamo missed the playoffs in 2020 for the 6th time in 7 years, finishing last in the Western Conference.  The 2020 U.S. Open Cup was canceled due to the COVID-19 pandemic.

2020 was the Dynamo's first year with head coach Tab Ramos and the sixth season under General Manager Matt Jordan. On the front office end, it was Gabriel Brener's fifth season as majority owner and John Walker's second season as President of Business Operations.

Current squad 

Appearances and goals are totals for MLS regular season only.

Player movement

In 
Per Major League Soccer and club policies terms of the deals do not get disclosed.

Out

Loans in

Loans out

MLS SuperDraft

Coaching staff

Non-competitive

Preseason friendlies

Midseason friendlies

Competitive

MLS

Standings

Western Conference table

Overall table

MLS is Back Tournament 

The MLS is Back Tournament was a one-off tournament during the 2020 Major League Soccer season to mark the league's return to action from the COVID-19 pandemic. The tournament featured a group stage, followed by a knockout stage.  Games during the group stage counted as regular season matches.  The schedule was revealed on June 24.

Group E

Results summary

Match results 

=== U.S. Open Cup ===

As an MLS club, the Dynamo was originally set to enter the competition in the Third or Fourth Round, tentatively scheduled for April 21–23 or May 19–20. The U.S. Soccer Federation canceled the tournament on August 17, 2020, due to the COVID-19 pandemic.

Season statistics 
{| class="wikitable sortable" style="text-align:center;"
|+
! rowspan="2" |No.
! rowspan="2" |Pos
! rowspan="2" |Nat
! rowspan="2" |Player
! colspan="5" |Total
! colspan="5" |MLS
|-
!
!
!
!style="width:30px;"|
!style="width:30px;"|
!
!
!
!style="width:30px;"|
!style="width:30px;"|
|-
|1||GK||||align=left|Marko Marić||23||0||0||1||0||23||0||0||1||0
|-
|2||DF||||align=left|Alejandro Fuenmayor||5||0||0||1||0||5||0||0||1||0
|-
|3||DF||||align=left|Adam Lundqvist||21||0||0||3||0||21||0||0||3||0
|-
|4||DF||||align=left|Zarek Valentin||19||0||3||0||0||19||0||3||0||0
|-
|5||DF||||align=left|Aljaž Struna||17||0||0||6||0||17||0||0||6||0
|-
|6||MF||||align=left|Wilfried Zahibo||4||0||0||2||0||4||0||0||2||0
|-
|7||FW||||align=left|Alberth Elis||6||4||3||1||1||6||4||3||1||1
|-
|8||MF||||align=left|Memo Rodríguez||21||5||3||5||0||21||5||3||5||0
|-
|9||FW||||align=left|Mauro Manotas||20||3||2||0||1||20||3||2||0||1
|-
|10||MF||||align=left|Tomás Martínez||11||0||0||1||0||11||0||0||1||0
|-
|11||MF||||align=left|Tommy McNamara||4||0||0||0||0||4||0||0||0||0
|-
|11||FW||||align=left|Ariel Lassiter||16||3||1||2||0||16||3||1||2||0
|-
|12||FW||||align=left|Niko Hansen||17||2||1||0||0||17||2||1||0||0
|-
|13||FW||||align=left|Christian Ramirez||15||2||2||0||0||15||2||2||0||0
|-
|14||MF||||align=left|Marcelo Palomino||3||0||0||0||0||3||0||0||0||0
|-
|15||DF||||align=left|Maynor Figueroa||20||2||0||7||0||20||2||0||7||0
|-
|17||MF||||align=left|Nico Lemoine||11||0||0||1||0||11||0||0||1||0
|-
|18||DF||||align=left|José Bizama||8||0||0||1||0||8||0||0||1||0
|-
|19||FW||||align=left|Michael Salazar||1||0||0||1||0||1||0||0||1||0
|-
|21||FW||||align=left|Ronaldo Peña||1||0||0||0||0||1||0||0||0||0
|-
|22||MF||||align=left|Matías Vera||20||0||0||7||1||20||0||0||7||1
|-
|23||FW||||align=left|Darwin Quintero||22||7||10||5||0||22||7||10||5||0
|-
|24||MF||||align=left|Darwin Cerén||20||1||4||3||0||20||1||4||3||0
|-
|26||GK||||align=left|Michael Nelson||0||0||0||0||0||0||0||0||0||0
|-
|27||MF||||align=left|Boniek García||18||0||0||5||0||18||0||0||5||0
|-
|28||DF||||align=left|Erik McCue||0||0||0||0||0||0||0||0||0||0
|-
|29||DF||||align=left|Sam Junqua||9||1||0||0||0||9||1||0||0||0
|-
|32||DF||||align=left|Kyle Adams||0||0||0||0||0||0||0||0||0||0
|-
|36||DF||||align=left|Víctor Cabrera||10||0||0||1||0||10||0||0||1||0
|-
|55||GK||||align=left|Cody Cropper||0||0||0||0||0||0||0||0||0||0

References 

2020
Houston Dynamo
Houston Dynamo
Houston Dynamo